The Pinson Mounds comprise a prehistoric Native American complex located in Madison County, Tennessee, in the region that is known as the Eastern Woodlands. The complex, which includes 17 mounds, an earthen geometric enclosure, and numerous habitation areas, was most likely built during the Middle Woodland period (c. 1-500 AD). The complex is the largest group of Middle Woodland mounds in the United States.

The Pinson Mounds are now part of Pinson Mounds State Archaeological Park, one of two archaeological parks in Tennessee (the other being Old Stone Fort near Manchester). Pinson Mounds is a National Historic Landmark and is listed on the National Register of Historic Places.

Geographic setting

The Pinson Mounds are located on a plateau-like upland above the wetlands that line the banks of the South Fork of the Forked Deer River. The river and its wetlands form the complex's southern boundary. The Pinson Mounds are located amidst three distinctive biotic zones: the oak forests atop the plateau, the cypress forests in the wet bottomlands, and the beech forests on the slopes between the uplands and the bottomlands.  The ground is mostly composed of Tertiary period rocks known for producing high-quality clay.

The mounds complex can be roughly divided into three sections— the Inner section, situated at the center of the complex around Saul's Mound, the Western (or Ozier) section, and the Eastern section, which includes the geometric enclosure. A stream known as Hudson Branch runs perpendicular to the Forked Deer River and divides the Inner section from the Western section. The Eastern and Western sections are both roughly 1,500 meters from the Inner section.

The Pinson Mounds complex is managed by the Tennessee Department of Environment and Conservation. The Western section is managed by the Tennessee Division of Forestry and includes a nursery and irrigation pond. Pinson Mounds State Archaeological Park is located appx. 2.5 miles east of the town of Pinson and approximately 10 miles southeast of Jackson.

Archaeological features

The mounds range in height from the prominent 72-foot Saul's Mound to barely noticeable rises. Most mounds were probably constructed between 100 and 300 AD, based on radiocarbon dating and the predominance of Woodland-period artifacts found at the site. The following are major features at the Pinson Mounds site:

Inner Complex

 Sauls' Mound (Mound 9), at the center of the complex. The mound was named after John Sauls, the owner of the property before its purchase by the state. Sauls' Mound is the second-highest prehistoric mound in the United States.  The mound is rectangular in formation, with each corner aligned with one of the four cardinal directions. The mound's function was believed to be ceremonial. A viewing platform has been constructed atop the mound for park visitors. Dimensions: base— 112 x 91 meters, height— 22 meters.
 Mound 10, a few meters to the east of Sauls' Mound. Mound 10 is believed to have been a platform mound with a ceremonial function. Dimensions: base— 61 x 40 meters, height— 1.3 meters.
 Mound 11 Sector, a few meters to the north of Sauls' Mound, behind the museum. Mound 11 is a natural rise that is believed to have been a habitation area during the Middle Woodland period.
 Mound 12, several meters southwest of Sauls' Mound. Mound 12 was a burial mound built upon an Early Woodland habitation area. Dimensions: base— 23 x 17 meters, height— 1.3 meters.
 Mound 14 Sector, several meters southwest of Sauls' Mound. The Mound 14 Sector was a late-Woodland/early-Mississippian habitation area.
 Mound 15, several hundred meters southwest of Sauls' Mound. Part of Mound 15 has been destroyed by cultivation. Dimensions: base— 46 x 50 meters, height— appx. 1 meter.
 Mound 17, several hundred meters southeast of Sauls' Mound. Dimensions: appx. 12 meters long with a height of 1 meter.

Eastern Section

William Myer gave the enclosure its present name in the early 20th century, although archeologists believe its function to have been primarily ceremonial rather than defensive. The enclosed area is not level, with the western edge being approximately  lower than the eastern edge.
 Mound 29, a rectangular platform mound located along the eastern edge of the geometric enclosure. Mound 29 is aligned with Sauls' Mound in the direction of the equinox sunrise. Dimensions: base— , height— .
 Mound 30, a bird-shaped mound a few meters south of Mound 29. The bird shape is thought to have been due to recent cultivation and subsequent erosion.
Mound 28 is almost aligned with Sauls' Mound in the direction of the summer solstice sunrise. Dimensions: base— , height— .

Western (Ozier) Section

 The Ozier Mound (Mound 5), a rectangular platform mound with an earthen ramp facing northeast. At 33 feet, the Ozier Mound is the second-largest mound in the complex.
 The Twin Mounds (Mound 6), a double-conical mound located a few meters south of the Ozier Mound. The Twin Mounds were burial mounds.
 Mound 31, a burial mound located a few meters south of the Ozier Mound. Base appx. 40 x 60 meters.
The Cochran Area is believed to have been a temporary habitation area. The Cochran area covers appx. .

Pinson Mounds in recorded history 

After the Chickasaw were forced from much of West Tennessee in 1818, land speculator Joel Pinson arrived in what is now Madison County to survey the area. Pinson "discovered" the complex which was named after him in 1820.  The complex did not receive much attention until a Jackson-area journalist named J.G. Cisco began writing about it in the late 19th century.  Cisco's articles drew the interest of the Smithsonian Institution.

In 1916 the Smithsonian dispatched the archaeologist William E. Myer to investigate the site.  Myer suggested that the entire complex was built according to a master plan, and created a map for the site. In 1947, the Tennessee Division of Forestry purchased the Western section of the Pinson site.

Archaeological surveys and excavations

At the request of the Jackson Archaeological Society and the National Park Service, in December 1961 the University of Tennessee archaeologists Fred Fisher and Charles McNutt carried out the first major excavation of the Pinson Mounds.  In the Mound 14 Sector, Fisher and McNutt discovered the remains of a  house surrounded by a posthole-lined wall-trench and containing a central hearth and storage pits.  Based primarily on the vast amount of pre-Mississippian culture debris found at the site and radiocarbon dating of charcoal, Fisher and McNutt concluded that the Pinson Mounds were probably built during the Middle Woodland period, c. 1-500 AD.

Excavations by Dan Morse and Richard Polhemus in 1963 uncovered what they believed was an oval-shaped house, a large hearth, and various refuse pits. Morse and Polhemus agreed that the mounds were mostly built during the Middle Woodland period.  The state purchased the prehistoric property in 1965 from the Williams and Saul families. It was added to the National Register of Historic Places that same year.

In the 1970s, John Broster of the Tennessee Division of Archaeology carried out extensive investigations of the site's Western section and the Mound 12 Sector.  Broster uncovered a human cremation pit and evidence of Early Woodland-period habitation at Mound 12.  Broster's team also found a number of "exotic" artifacts at the Cochran area.  This suggested Pinson Mounds may have been a "manufacture" area for grave goods, or a regional trade center.

In the 1980s, Robert Mainfort discovered six tombs in the Twin Mounds, one of which contained the remains of eight young women wearing headdresses with copper adornments.  Another tomb had four older men, one of whom had been buried with two round rattles bearing abstract designs.  Mainfort also uncovered a single burial in Mound 31 and evidence of food offerings at the base of the mounds.

Excavations carried out prior to construction of park facilities uncovered a possible habitation area at Mound 11 and a large number of 19th-century artifacts.  In the late 1990s, four additional mounds were verified as prehistoric, bringing the total to 17.

The function of the Pinson Mounds

The Middle Woodland natives most likely built the Pinson Mounds primarily for religious ceremonial purposes, although their motives have yet to be established definitively. The Ozier Mound contains no burials and because of its shape, ramped and flat-topped, it was most likely used as a ceremonial platform. It is one of the oldest such mounds in the Eastern Woodlands region. At least three of the mounds— 6, 12, and 31— contain burials or cremations.  Excavations have turned up a relatively scant amount of cultural material (e.g., arrowheads and pottery fragments), which points to a lack of permanent habitation at the Pinson Mounds site.

Some evidence suggests that the layout of the Pinson Mounds might be due to astronomical alignment, and expresses the people's cosmology, as is the case at some later mound complexes, such as Cahokia.  The corners of Sauls' Mound, for instance, face the four cardinal directions.  The Eastern and Western sections of the complex are roughly equidistant (appx. 1,500 meters) from the Inner complex, although the alignment is not exact.  Mound 29 in the Eastern section is aligned with Sauls' Mound in the direction of the equinox sunrise, and Mound 28 is almost aligned with Sauls' in the direction of the Summer solstice sunrise.  To date, no mound has been found in the direction of the Winter solstice sunrise.

Pinson Mounds State Archaeological Park

The park's museum is built within a "replica" of a platform mound. Its exhibits include artifacts obtained from the various excavations at the Pinson site, as well as various other artifacts from around the region. The museum is also home to the West Tennessee Regional Archaeology offices and an archaeological library.

The park contains approximately 6 miles of walking trails, most of which explore the mounds and associated features. South of Sauls' Mound, a boardwalk looks out over the South Fork of the Forked Deer River and its wetlands. The park is also the site of Archaeofest, an event held every September that celebrates the site's prehistoric builders.

See also
 Old Stone Fort
 Hopewell culture
 List of burial mounds in the United States
 List of National Historic Landmarks in Tennessee
 National Register of Historic Places listings in Madison County, Tennessee

References

External links
 Pinson Mounds State Archaeological Park — official site
 Pinson Mounds Information & Videos - Chickasaw.TV
 Pinson Mounds - TN History for Kids

Hopewellian peoples
Woodland period
State parks of Tennessee
National Historic Landmarks in Tennessee
Archaeological sites on the National Register of Historic Places in Tennessee
Museums in Madison County, Tennessee
Archaeological museums in Tennessee
Native American museums in Tennessee
Protected areas of Madison County, Tennessee
Archaeological parks
National Register of Historic Places in Madison County, Tennessee